Jebbia is a surname. Notable people with the surname include:

James Jebbia (born 1963), English businessman and fashion designer
Shawnae Jebbia (born 1971), American entertainer and former beauty queen